Gafar Adefolarin Durosinmi (born 2 January 1991) is a Nigerian footballer who plays for Uthai Thani in Thai League 2.

References 

https://us.soccerway.com/players/adefolarin-durosinmi/397266/

External links 
Profile at Sisaket F.C Official Website
Profile at Thai Premier League Official Website

1991 births
Living people
Nigerian footballers
Nigerian expatriate footballers
Nigerian expatriate sportspeople in Thailand
Expatriate footballers in Cambodia
Expatriate footballers in Thailand
Adefolarin Durosinmi
Adefolarin Durosinmi
Association football wingers
Yoruba sportspeople